Konagaya is a Japanese surname. Notable people with the surname include:

, Japanese academic
, Japanese footballer

Japanese-language surnames